Mazhar Ansari (born 17 July 1961) is an Indian cricketer. He played in 35 first-class matches for Uttar Pradesh from 1984/85 to 1991/92.

See also
 List of Uttar Pradesh cricketers

References

External links
 

1961 births
Living people
Indian cricketers
Uttar Pradesh cricketers
Cricketers from Lucknow